The 1990–91 Macedonian Republic League was the 47th season since its establishment. FK Makedonija Gjorche Petrov won their first and only championship title.

Participating teams

Final table

References

External links
Football Federation of Macedonia 

Macedonian Football League seasons
Yugo
4